The women's canoe sprint K-1 500 metres at the 2012 Olympic Games in London took place between 7 and 9 August at Eton Dorney.

Danuta Kozák from Hungary won the gold medal. Inna Osypenko from Ukraine won silver and South Africa's Bridgette Hartley took bronze.

Competition format

The competition comprised heats, semi-finals and a final round.

Schedule

All times are British Summer Time (UTC+01:00)

Results

Heats
The fastest six boats in each heat qualified for the semi-finals.

Heat 1

Heat 2

Heat 3

Heat 4

Semifinals
The first two canoeists in each semi-final and the two fastest third placed boats qualified for the 'A' final. The fourth and fifth ranked canoeists in each semi-final and the two fastest sixth placed boats qualified for the 'B' final.

Semifinal 1

Semifinal 2

Semifinal 3

Finals

Final B

Final A

References

Canoeing at the 2012 Summer Olympics
Olyp
Women's events at the 2012 Summer Olympics